Joseph Pilon (March 27, 1826 – April 18, 1909) was a farmer, merchant and political figure in Quebec. He represented Bagot in the Legislative Assembly of Quebec from 1886 to 1890 as a Liberal member.

He was born in Vaudreuil, Lower Canada, the son of Toussaint Pilon. Pilon owned a mill at Saint-Éphrem-d'Upton. He was mayor of Saint-Ephrem-d'Upton for 37 years. He also served as justice of the peace for Saint-Hyacinthe district and as a member of the school board. In 1852, he married Marie Bricot. Pilon ran unsuccessfully for a seat in the Quebec assembly in 1867. He was defeated by Milton McDonald when he ran for reelection in 1890 and was an unsuccessful candidate for a seat in the House of Commons in 1891. Pilon served as associate registrar for Bagot County from 1898 until his death in Upton at the age of 83.

References
 

Quebec Liberal Party MNAs
Mayors of places in Quebec
Candidates in the 1891 Canadian federal election
1826 births
1909 deaths
Liberal Party of Canada candidates for the Canadian House of Commons